Game of the Seven Kingdoms (Chinese: , p qī-guó-xiàng-qí ;) is a seven-player variant of the game xiangqi ("Chinese chess"). It is traditionally ascribed to Sima Guang, although he died well before the 13th century, to which this game is traditionally dated. The rules of the game can be found in his book, 古局象棋圖. There is skepticism regarding the game's 13th-century formulation.

Game rules

Players
The game is normally played by seven players. If there are fewer players, the extra kingdoms can be removed, or some players can own more than one kingdom. Players are allowed to team up, but may not discuss with their teammates during the game.

Equipment and setup
The board is the same as a Go board. Each side has 17 pieces: a general (將), a chancellor (偏), a diplomat (裨), a cannon (砲), a go-between (行人), an archer (弓), a crossbowman (弩), two dagger soldiers (刀), four swordsmen (劍), and four knights (騎). The name of the general varies according to the kingdom it represents. The seven kingdoms are:

Qin (秦), the white army, in the west
Chu (楚), the red army, in the south
Han (韓), the orange army, in the south
Qi (齊), the blue army, in the east
Wei (魏), the green army, in the east
Zhao (趙), the purple army, in the north
Yan (燕), the black army, in the north

The yellow piece in the board center is "the emperor" (周), which does not belong to any player.

Gameplay
The game starts with Qin, the white kingdom, and then the order of play is counterclockwise.

The mechanism of the game is similar to many chess variants: pieces have their own moves and may capture one another by displacement. Except for the cannon and go-between, all pieces capture the same way that they move. There is no check in this game (so, it is not mandatory to remove an attack on the general).

Moves of pieces
Note that pieces are placed at intersections.

Victory
A player is out when he loses his general or more than 10 pieces. The player who captures the general or the most pieces of the loser wins his remaining army. The final victory goes to the first player who wins two kingdoms or captures more than 30 pieces.

See also
 Game of the Three Kingdoms

References

Bibliography

Chinese ancient games
Chess variants
Xiangqi variants